Amélie Veille (born September 8, 1981) is a Canadian singer and songwriter. Veille was born in Saint-Georges, Quebec. Her work has been compared to that of Lynda Lemay.

Discography
 2003 : Amélie Veille (Disques Passeport)
 2006 : Un moment ma folie (Disques Vivamusik)
 2012 : Mon cœur pour te garder (Artic)
 2016 : Les moments parfaits (Artic)

References

External links
 AllMusic profile
 Official website

1981 births
Canadian singer-songwriters
French Quebecers
French-language singers of Canada
Living people
People from Saint-Georges, Quebec
Singers from Quebec
Songwriters from Quebec
21st-century Canadian women singers